Perth Burghs was a district of burghs constituency of the House of Commons of the Parliament of Great Britain (at Westminster) from 1708 to 1801 and of the Parliament of the United Kingdom (also at Westminster) from 1801 until 1832, representing a seat for one Member of Parliament (MP)

Creation
The British parliamentary constituency was created in 1708 following the Acts of Union, 1707 and replaced the former Parliament of Scotland burgh constituencies of  Perth,  Cupar, Dundee, Forfar and St Andrews

Boundaries 

The constituency covered five burghs: Perth in the county of Perth, Cupar and St Andrews in the county of Fife, and Dundee and Forfar in the county of Forfar.

History
The constituency elected one Member of Parliament (MP) by the first past the post system until the seat was abolished for the 1832 general election.

For the 1832 general election, as a result of the Representation of the People (Scotland) Act 1832, the burgh of Perth was merged into the new Perth burgh constituency, the burghs of Cupar and St Andrews were merged into the Fife county constituency, the burgh of Dundee was merged into new Dundee burgh constituency, and the burgh of Forfar was merged into the new Montrose Burghs constituency.

Members of Parliament

Election results

The electoral system for this constituency gave each of the five burghs one vote, with an additional casting vote (to break ties) for the burgh where the election was held. The place of election rotated amongst the burghs in successive Parliaments.  The vote of a burgh was exercised by a burgh commissioner, who was elected by the burgh councillors.

The normal order of rotation for this district was Perth, Dundee, St Andrews, Cupar and Forfar.  However the Court of Session had the power to suspend the participation of a burgh, as a punishment for corruption, which could disrupt the rotation if the normal returning burgh was not able to participate.

At the time of the disputed elections in 1830 and 1831, Dundee was not able to take part in the voting. Although Dundee was not the returning burgh for the 1830-31 Parliament, its absence made the elections less certain and encouraged wrongdoing by candidates.

The reference to some candidates as Non Partisan does not, necessarily, mean that they did not have a party allegiance.  It means that the sources consulted did not specify a party allegiance. The sources used were Stooks Smith as well as Namier and Brooke (see the References section for further details).

Elections in the 18th century

Elections in the 1710s

Elections in the 1720s 

 This election resulted in a double return of both candidates. The House of Commons seated Erskine.

Elections in the 1730s

Elections in the 1740s 

 December 1743: Death of Drummond

Notes

References 
 History of Parliament: House of Commons 1754-1790, by Sir Lewis Namier and James Brooke (Sidgwick & Jackson 1964)
 The Parliaments of England by Henry Stooks Smith (1st edition published in three volumes 1844–50), second edition edited (in one volume) by F.W.S. Craig (Political Reference Publications 1973)
 

Historic parliamentary constituencies in Scotland (Westminster)
Constituencies of the Parliament of the United Kingdom established in 1708
Constituencies of the Parliament of the United Kingdom disestablished in 1832